...a milicija trenira strogoću! (i druge pjesmice za djecu) (trans. ...and Militsiya Trains Strictness (and Other Songs for Children)) is a children's music album recorded by Yugoslav child singer Ratimir Boršić "Rača" and Yugoslav rock band Bijelo Dugme, released in 1983.

Background
The lyrics for the album were written by poet Duško Trifunović, with the music by Bijelo Dugme leader Goran Bregović. It was initially planned for Seid Memić "Vajta" to sing the vocals, but eventually, vocals were recorded by the eleven-year-old Ratimir Boršić. The album was released under Ratimir Boršić Rača & Bijelo Dugme moniker. The album cover was designed by Bijelo Dugme's old collaborator Dragan S. Stefanović.

Track listing 
All songs written by Duško Trifunović (lyrics) and Goran Bregović (music).

Personnel
Ratimir Boršić – vocals

Bijelo Dugme
Goran Bregović – guitar, producer, recorded by
Zoran Redžić – bass guitar
Ipe Ivandić – drums
Vlado Pravdić – keyboards

Additional personnel
Duško Trifunović – lyrics
Mahmut Ferović – recorded by
Dragan S. Stefanović – design

Reception
The album was well received by the critics, who pointed up that Bregović and Trifunović do not consider their audience "mentally immature".

Legacy
The title track was often performed by Bijelo Dugme in concert, and a live version of it appears on the band's live albums Mramor, kamen i željezo (1987) and Turneja 2005: Sarajevo, Zagreb, Beograd (2005).

References

External links
...a milicija trenira strogoću! (i druge pjesmice za djecu) at Discogs

1983 albums
Bijelo Dugme albums
Jugoton albums
Children's music albums